The 2007 AFC Asian Cup was the 14th edition of the men's AFC Asian Cup, a quadrennial international football tournament organised by the Asian Football Confederation (AFC). The finals were held from 7 to 29 July 2007. For the first time in its history, the competition was co-hosted by four countries in Southeast Asia: Indonesia, Malaysia, Thailand and Vietnam; it was the first time in football history more than two countries joined host of a major continental competition and the only one to had ever taken place until the UEFA Euro 2020.

Iraq won the continental title for the first time after defeating three-time champion Saudi Arabia 1–0 in the final. As the winner, Iraq represented the AFC in the 2009 FIFA Confederations Cup.

Before 2007 and every four years, Asia often held its continental tournament from 1956 until China in 2004. With the Summer Olympic Games and the European Football Championship also held in the same year as the Asian Cup, the AFC changed their tradition. From 2007, AFC decided to hold its continental tournament a year earlier, and every four years henceforth from that date.

An estimated worldwide television audience of 650 million people tuned in to watch the 2007 AFC Asian Cup.

Australia participated for the first time since moving to the AFC from the OFC. Australia also happened to be the tournament's first nation aside from the co-hosts to qualify for the 2007 Asian Cup.

Host selection
Initially, three Southeast Asian countries, Thailand, Indonesia and Malaysia, represented each other bids hoping to win the rights to host the tournament. The then-AFC President Mohammed Bin Hammam proposed and presented a move to have four host nations for the 2007 Asian Cup to these Southeast Asian states. This led to a scramble to have the fourth host country, which Vietnam was later chosen to co-host alongside the three others.

However, Bin Hammam later regretted this decision and called it his "mistake", citing the financial and logistic difficulties in organising an event across four countries. He said that "It is proving very difficult for [the executive committee as they] have to have four organising committees, four media centres and there are also financial considerations." He also revealed that "[he would] definitely [not do] it [again]", if he had the choice.

In June 2005, the AFC warned Thailand that it needed to improve its facilities before 2007, otherwise it would be dropped, possibly being replaced with Singapore. On 12 August of the same year, the AFC confirmed that Thailand would be a co-host of the 2007 Asian Cup. However, in October 2006, Thailand was again warned to improve its facilities in 90 days.

Venues

Qualification

The qualification ran from 22 February 2006 to 15 November 2006. For the first time, the defending champions (in this tournament, Japan) did not get an automatic qualification. Indonesia, Malaysia, Thailand, and Vietnam automatically qualified as co-hosts. Twenty-four teams were split into six groups of four to compete for the 12 remaining spots in the final tournament.

1 Bold indicates champion for that year
2 Italic indicates host
3 Vietnam's debut since the reunification of Vietnam in 1976
4 As South Vietnam

Seeds
For the first time, the seeds are based on the October 2006 FIFA World Rankings instead of the basis of the performance from the previous AFC Asian Cup competition. This was to ensure that the same number of strong teams do not meet in the early stage.

The four seeded teams were announced on 19 December 2006. The seeds comprised Pot 4 in the draw. Pot 1 consists of the teams from all co-hosts.

The draw was held on 19 December 2006 at the Kuala Lumpur Convention Centre.

Officials
16 referees and 24 assistant referees were officially cleared following a fitness test on 2 July in Kuala Lumpur, Malaysia. One referee and two assistant referees were also named from the CAF.

Referees
  Matthew Breeze
  Mark Shield
  Jasim Karim
  Sun Baojie
  Masoud Moradi
  Yuichi Nishimura
  Saad Kamil Al-Fadhli
  Talaat Najm
  Abdulrahman Abdou
  Khalil Al-Ghamdi
  Eddy Maillet
  Kwon Jong-chul
  Lee Gi-young
  Muhsen Basma
  Satop Tongkhan (†)
  Ali Al-Badwawi

Assistant Referees
  Mohd. Shahidul Islam
  Liu Tiejun
  Evarist Menkouande
  Poon Ming Fai
  Benjamin Silva
  Reza Sokhandan
  Mohammad Kadom Arab
  Awni Hassouneh
  Toru Sagara
  Jeong Hae-sang
  Mohammed Al-Ghamdi
  Yaser Ahmad Marad
  Mustafa Taleb
  Mohd. Sabri bin Mat Daud
  Win U Kyaw
  Mohamed Saeed
  Abdullah Al-Amouri
  Ibrahim Ali Mohammed
  Célestin Ntagungira
  Yew Mun Tang
  Hamdi Al-Kadri
  Begench Allaberdiyev
  Saleh Al-Marzouqi
  Viktor Serazitdinov

(†): Replaced  Shamsul Maidin after he pulled out with injury.

Squads

Tournament summary

The Asian Cup saw many upsets in the early stages of the tournament, with tournament favourites Australia and South Korea performing poorly in the group stage.

In Group A, Oman held the Socceroos to a surprising draw. The Omanis took the lead and would have won, if not for an injury time goal from Tim Cahill. Next, joint hosts and the lowest-ranked team in the competition, Vietnam, shocked the UAE with a 2–0 victory. In the same group, Qatar held Japan to a shock 1–1 draw. The result caused Japan's coach Ivica Osim to fly into a rage in which he branded his players as 'amateurs' and reduced his interpreter to tears. In Group D, Indonesia continued the undefeated streak of the hosts by defeating Bahrain 2–1. Malaysia ended up as the only host country to lose their opening match after a crushing 5-1 defeat to China. Thailand recorded just their 2nd win in the Asian Cup finals (their other was in 1972 against Cambodia), and its first ever win in regulation, when they beat Oman 2–0 on 12 July. Meanwhile, Australia was upset by a 3–1 defeat to Iraq the following day, leaving them floundering in the tournament despite high expectations in third place. However, Australia's 4–0 demolition of Thailand at the last match day saw them into the quarter-finals, as Oman was unable to overcome Iraq in a goalless draw.

Vietnam continued to stun all predictions when they drew 1-1 with 2006 ASIAD champions Qatar, while Japan finally got their first win when they thrashed the UAE 3–1. Although Vietnam lost 1–4 to Japan, the UAE's 2–1 comeback win over Qatar witnessed Vietnam's first time ever to qualify into the next round and became the only host to progress through despite being in the group of three different champions. On the other hand, while Malaysia continued its poor form with 0–5 and 0–2 losses to Uzbekistan and Iran, thus going out of the tournament without a point. China's shocking elimination occurred when they were hammered 0–3 by the Uzbeks, despite having drawn 2–2 with Iran and was expected to qualify from group stage with an easy win.

Bahrain shocked the whole tournament by defeating South Korea 2–1 in Group D, leaving the Koreans in the verge of elimination when Indonesia was beaten 1–2 by Saudi Arabia. However, South Korea finally progressed with a 1–0 win over hosts Indonesia and with Saudi Arabia destroying Bahrain 4–0, it was enough to seal them in.

In the quarter-finals, Iraq defeated Vietnam 2–0, while South Korea needed a penalty shootout to eliminate Iran 4–2. Japan also needed a penalty shootout to defeat Australia 4–3 (this was the first time Australia's goalkeeper Mark Schwarzer had ever come out on the losing end of a penalty shoot-out), and Saudi Arabia won over Uzbekistan 2–1. Iraq upset the Koreans in the semi-finals by winning 4–3 on penalties, resulting in thousands of Iraqis celebrating in the streets of Baghdad. Over 50 Iraqis were killed by terrorist bombs targeting these crowds. In the other semi-finals, Saudi Arabia eliminated defending champions Japan after a 3–2 win to make an all-Arab affair for the final match.

Iraq went on to defeat the Saudis 1–0, taking the Asian Cup title. Iraqi forward and captain Younis Mahmoud was given the title of Most Valuable Player. South Korea took third place, narrowly beating Japan 6–5 on penalties. It was the third consecutive match in the tournament that South Korea drew 0–0 before a penalty shootout. Iraq, Saudi Arabia and South Korea, as the top three teams in the tournament, all received automatic berths to the 2011 Asian Cup along with the next hosts Qatar.

Group stage

Thailand

Group A

Vietnam

Group B

Malaysia

Group C

Indonesia

Group D

Knockout stage

Quarter-finals

Vietnam

Thailand

Malaysia

Indonesia

Semi-finals

Malaysia

Vietnam

Indonesia

Third place play-off

Final

Statistics

Goalscorers
With four goals, Younis Mahmoud, Naohiro Takahara and Yasser Al-Qahtani are the top scorers in the tournament. In total, 84 goals were scored by 57 different players, with two of them credited as own goals.
4 goals

  Younis Mahmoud
  Naohiro Takahara
  Yasser Al-Qahtani

3 goals

  Mark Viduka
  Sebastián Soria
  Maksim Shatskikh

2 goals

  Han Peng
  Shao Jiayi
  Wang Dong
  Javad Nekounam
  Seiichiro Maki
  Shunsuke Nakamura
  Ahmed Al-Mousa
  Malek Mouath
  Taisir Al-Jassim
  Pipat Thonkanya
  Saeed Al Kass
  Timur Kapadze

1 goal

  Harry Kewell
  John Aloisi
  Michael Beauchamp
  Tim Cahill
  Ismail Abdul-Latif
  Salman Isa
  Sayed Jalal
  Mao Jianqing
  Bambang Pamungkas
  Budi Sudarsono
  Elie Aiboy
  Andranik Teymourian
  Ferydoon Zandi
  Jalal Hosseini
  Javad Kazemian
  Hawar Mulla Mohammed
  Karrar Jassim
  Nashat Akram
  Yasuhito Endō
  Yuji Nakazawa
  Yuki Abe
  Indra Putra
  Badar Al-Maimani
  Abdulrahman Al-Qahtani
  Saad Al-Harthi
  Choi Sung-kuk
  Kim Do-heon
  Kim Jung-woo
  Sutee Suksomkit
  Faisal Khalil
  Alexander Geynrikh
  Aziz Ibragimov
  Pavel Solomin
  Ulugbek Bakayev
  Huỳnh Quang Thanh
  Lê Công Vinh
  Phan Thanh Bình

1 own goal

  Rahman Rezaei (against Uzbekistan)
  Keita Suzuki (against Vietnam)

Awards
Most Valuable Player
 Younis Mahmoud

Top scorer
 Younis Mahmoud
 Yasser Al-Qahtani
 Naohiro Takahara

Best Goalkeeper
 Noor Sabri

Best Defender
 Bassim Abbas

Fair Play Award

Most Entertaining Team

Team of the tournament

The Toshiba All-Star XI was voted for by fans on the official Asian Cup website.

Final standings

Marketing

Official match ball
The Official Match Ball for the 2007 AFC Asian Cup was launched by Nike on 15 May 2007, making it the first time ever that a ball had been launched specifically for any football competition in Asia. The Nike Mercurial Veloci AC features four blue stripes with gold trim with each host city's name inscribed, as well as the AFC Asian Cup logo.

Official song 
The AFC selected "I Believe", a 2004 single by Thai singer Tata Young as the tournament's official song.

See also
 Sports diplomacy

References

External links

 AFC Asian Cup 2007 Official Site (Archived)
 Asian Cup 2007 at RSSSF

 
AFC Asian Cup tournaments
International association football competitions hosted by Thailand
International association football competitions hosted by Indonesia
International association football competitions hosted by Malaysia
International association football competitions hosted by Vietnam
Asia
2007 in Thai football
2007 in Malaysian football
2007 in Vietnamese football
July 2007 sports events in Asia